Mazie is a census-designated place (CDP) in Mayes County, Oklahoma, United States. The population was 91 at the 2010 census, almost unchanged from the figure of 88 recorded in 2000.

Geography
Mazie is located at  (36.10776708816489,-95.36352296009368).

The Union Mission Site, about 5 miles northeast of Mazie, is on the National Register of Historic Places listings in Mayes County, Oklahoma.

Demographics

As of the census of 2000, there were 88 people, 39 households, and 26 families residing in the CDP. The population density was 38.0 people per square mile (14.6/km2). There were 40 housing units at an average density of 17.3/sq mi (6.7/km2). The racial makeup of the CDP was 82.95% White, 9.09% African American, 5.68% Native American, and 2.27% from two or more races.

There were 39 households, out of which 30.8% had children under the age of 18 living with them, 56.4% were married couples living together, 7.7% had a female householder with no husband present, and 33.3% were non-families. 33.3% of all households were made up of individuals, and 15.4% had someone living alone who was 65 years of age or older. The average household size was 2.26 and the average family size was 2.88.

In the CDP, the population was spread out, with 21.6% under the age of 18, 6.8% from 18 to 24, 22.7% from 25 to 44, 35.2% from 45 to 64, and 13.6% who were 65 years of age or older. The median age was 44 years. For every 100 females, there were 87.2 males. For every 100 females age 18 and over, there were 86.5 males.

The median income for a household in the CDP was $12,000, and the median income for a family was $50,556. Males had a median income of $9,375 versus $26,250 for females. The per capita income for the CDP was $15,506. There were 41.7% of families and 37.2% of the population living below the poverty line, including 53.3% of under eighteens and none of those over 64.

References

Census-designated places in Mayes County, Oklahoma
Census-designated places in Oklahoma